Larissimus is a genus of braconid wasps in the family Braconidae. There is at least one described species in Larissimus, L. cassander, found in Brazil.

References

Microgastrinae